The Miss Perú 1990 pageant was held on April 1, 1990. That year, 20 candidates were competing for the 2 national crowns. The chosen winner represented Peru at the Miss Universe 1990 and Miss World 1990.The rest of the finalists would enter in different pageants.

Placements

Special Awards

 Best Regional Costume - Cuzco - Katia Márquez
 Miss Photogenic - Ica - Marisol García
 Miss Elegance - Ancash - Alessandra del Solar
 Miss Body - Piura - Laly Goyzueta
 Best Hair - USA Perú - Gisselle Martínez
 Miss Congeniality - Arequipa - Marisol Martínez
 Most Beautiful Face - Ica - Marisol García Freundt

.

Delegates

Amazonas - Patricia Pérez Vallo
Áncash - Alessandra del Solar
Apurímac - Roxana Saavedra
Arequipa - Marisol Martínez
Callao -  Eva Álvarez
Cuzco - Katia Márquez
Ica - Marisol García Freundt
Junín - Olga Schuller
La Libertad - Sofía Chlebowski
Lambayeque - Patricia Arbulú Barturen 
Loreto - Jackeline Cacho
Moquegua - Gabriela Calderón
Pasco - Ingrid Vogler 
Piura - Ursula 'Laly' Goyzueta
Puno - Liliana Contreras
Region Lima - Veronica Perez-Godoy
San Martín - Patricia Figueroa
Tacna - Alessandra Chávez
Ucayali - Karol Rodríguez
USA Peru - Gisselle Martínez Cuadros

References

Miss Peru
1990 in Peru
1990 beauty pageants